Fritillaria thunbergii is a flowering plant species in the lily family Liliaceae. It is native to Kazakhstan and in Xinjiang Province of western China, though cultivated in other places and naturalized in Japan and in other parts of China.

Fritillaria thunbergii produces bulbs up to 30 mm in diameter. The stem is up to 80 cm tall. The flowers are pale yellow, sometimes with a purple tinge or purple markings.

formerly included
Fritillaria thunbergii var. puqiensis (G.D.Yu & G.Y.Chen) P.K.Hsiao & S.C.Yu, now called Fritillaria monantha Migo

References

External links
Royal Botanic Gardens, Kew, Fritillaria thunbergii (Thunberg fritillary)
Flora of China Illustrations vol. 24, figures 114, 1-4 , line drawings
Pacific Bulb Society, Asian Fritillaria Four color photos of several species including Fritillaria thunbergii
TCM Wiki, Traditional Chinese Medicine, Bulbus Fritillariae Thunbergii photos of bulbs, information about use of Fritillaria thunbergii in traditional Chinese medicine

thunbergii
Flora of Asia
Plants described in 1784